Elias Spago (born 9 August 2001) is a Belgian professional footballer who plays as a centre-back for Challenger Pro League club Virton on loan from Seraing.

References

External links 
 
 

2001 births
Living people
Belgian footballers
Association football central defenders
R. Charleroi S.C. players
R. Châtelet S.C. players
Sint-Truidense V.V. players
R.F.C. Seraing (1922) players
R.E. Virton players
Challenger Pro League players
Belgian Pro League players